Online uncovering, also called doxing, is the practice of revealing private information about an individual or organization gathered from online sources. Methods include searching public databases, social media and email accounts, and hacking. When done by private individuals it is a form vigilantism. It can also be used by law enforcement departments. For example, it helped the Hong Kong Police Force to investigate the background information of suspects. Driven by the prevalence of the internet and online forums such as the Golden Forum, online uncovering has become a social phenomenon in Hong Kong. It is used to shame, harass, and tarnish of reputation of the victims.

Details
Online uncovering is a kind of cyber bullying. With online uncovering, the personal information, like the occupation, family members, home address, and telephone numbers, of the victims will be disclosed without any permission, which causes a great nuisance to them. People may spread out one's information to humiliate one, make one ashamed and infringe on one's privacy. Also, people tend to share videos of people's misconduct in public to the Internet, stirring up discussions and debates, also online uncovering of the people in the videos.

Examples

Method Used
There are various uncovering methods. Most cases are attributed to the victims’ mismanagement of personal information online.

Search Engine
Hackers will utilize engines such as Google to uncover the personal information through blogs, social networking websites or forums.

Software cracker
Hackers will uncover the IP address of the targeted person through interception software. They can also uncover personal information by discovering the Internet Services Provider of the IP address. Installing spyware and virus to the computer could misappropriate personal information either easily.

Social Engineering
Social Engineering means hackers tempt the target to disclose personal information via multiple approaches. They may also collect and gather information from the cyber friends of the target. Such actions may likely breach the law.

Forum
Some HK online forums such as Golden Forum have set the (Betray Friends page) to encourage netizens to post the photos of their fellows. But information disclosure is forbidden.

Impacts on Victims

Positive side
Most of the victims in online uncovering were doing something inappropriate, from maltreating animals to impolite actions. Through online uncovering, victims’ inappropriate actions would be pointed out. They would realize they were doing something wrong and make apologies or follow up actions. Just take the case of maltreating cat last year as an example. A student from City University maltreated his cat in hall and a picture was taken and posted on social networks. After the online uncovering, he made apology and promised maltreatments would not happen again.

Negative side
After online uncovering, victims’ personal information would be found out and circulated on the internet; such as, telephone number, address and photos. They would be annoyed by nonstop phone calls or even recognized by others on the street and criticized them. These all made them face a high pressure and some even suffer from mental illness, the case of material girl $500 was one of the examples.

References

Hong Kong Police Force
Cyberbullying